Olowo Ajaka was a traditional ruler of Owo Kingdom, Ondo state, southwestern Nigeria. He succeeded his father, Olowo Ajagbusi Ekun.

References

Yoruba monarchs
Nigerian traditional rulers
People from Owo
Olagbegi family